Bishop Pinkham Junior High School is a public junior high school in Calgary, Alberta, Canada. It has classes for grades 7 through 9, offering French, and English programs. Bishop Pinkham is located in the Lakeview community of Calgary. September 2017 was the last year that French grade 6 was offered at BP. As of September 2017, students leaving the elementary Spanish Bilingual program will enter middle school at AE Cross instead of Bishop Pinkham. At that point, Bishop Pinkham will only offer French and English to grades 7, 8, and 9.

The school is named after Bishop William Cyprian Pinkham who was the first Anglican bishop in Calgary.

School history

The school was founded in 1959 and was named after William Cyprian Pinkham who was a bishop in the city of Calgary. The school was classified as public. It features a late French immersion program, which starts in grade 7, as well as programs for continuing French immersion, and English students. French students take 4 subjects in French (math, social studies, science, and french language arts).

References

External links

Middle schools in Calgary
Educational institutions established in 1964
1964 establishments in Alberta